Nikolai Aleksandrovich or Nikolay Aleksandrovich (Russian: Николай Александрович) is a Russian male given name. It may refer to:
 Nikolai Aleksandrovich Abramov (1984–2011), a Russian football player
 Nikolai Aleksandrovich Aksyonov (born 1970), a Russian Olympic rower 
 Nikolai Aleksandrovich Aristov (1847 – c. 1903), a Russian türkologist
 Nikolai Aleksandrovich Averyanov (born 1989), a Russian professional football player
 Nikolai Alexandrovich Berdyaev (1874–1948), a Russian philosopher, theologian, and Christian existentialist
 Nikolai Aleksandrovich Bernstein (1896–1966), a Soviet neurophysiologist
 Nikolai Aleksandrovich Dergachyov (born 1994), a Russian football player
 Nikolai Aleksandrovich Dobrolyubov (1836–1861), a Russian literary critic, journalist, poet and revolutionary democrat
 Nikolay Aleksandrovich Kashtalinsky (1840–1917), a general in the Imperial Russian Army
 Nikolai Aleksandrovich Kozyrev (1908–1983), a Russian astronomer and astrophysicist
 Nikolai Aleksandrovich Krasil'nikov (1896–1973), a Russian microbiologist and soil scientist
 Nikolai Aleksandrovich Lebedev (1914–1942), a hero of the Soviet Union
 Nikolai Aleksandrovich Menshutkin (1842–1907), a Russian chemist
 Nikolai Aleksandrovich Nevsky (1892–1937), a Russian and Soviet linguist 
 Nikolai Aleksandrovich Paklyanov (born 1986), a Russian football player
 Nikolay Aleksandrovich Panin-Kolomenkin (1872–1956), a Russian figure skater and coach
 Nikolai Aleksandrovich Romanov (1868–1918), the last Emperor of Russia
 Nikolai Aleksandrovich Samoylov (born 1980), a Russian football player
 Nikolai Aleksandrovich Semashko (1874–1949), a Russian statesman
 Nikolai Aleksandrovich Stain (born 1964), a Russian football coach and a former player
 Nikolai Aleksandrovich Stasenko (born 1987), a Belarusian ice hockey player
 Nikolai Aleksandrovich Tikhonov (1905–1997), a Russian-Ukrainian Soviet statesman during the Cold War
 Nikolai Aleksandrovich Tolstykh (born 1956), a Russian football administrator and a former player
 Nikolai Aleksandrovich Uglanov (1886–1937), a Russian Bolshevik politician
 Nikolai Aleksandrovich Yaroshhenko (1846–1898), a Russian painter